Aspidodiadema montanum is a species of sea urchin of the family Aspidodiadematidae. Their armour is covered with spines. It is placed in the genus Aspidodiadema and lives in the sea. Aspidodiadema montanum was first scientifically described in 1981 by Mironov.

See also 
 Aspidodiadema jacobyi
 Aspidodiadema meijerei
 Aspidodiadema nicobaricum

References 

montanum
Animals described in 1981